The Netherlands was represented by Ronnie Tober, with the song "Morgen", at the 1968 Eurovision Song Contest, which took place on 6 April in London. "Morgen" was the winner of the Dutch national final for the contest, held on 28 February. Tober had previously finished second in the Dutch preselection in 1965.

Before Eurovision

Nationaal Songfestival 1968
The national final was held at the Tivoli in Utrecht, hosted by Elles Berger. Six songs were originally lined up for the final, but singers Tante Leen and Trea Dobbs both withdrew, leaving a field of just four. It is not currently known how the winning song was chosen.

At Eurovision 
On the night of the final Tober performed second in the running order, following Portugal and preceding Belgium. At the close of voting "Morgen" had received just 1 point (from Italy), placing the Netherlands joint last (with Finland) of the 17 entries. This was the fourth (and to date last in the finals) time the Netherlands ended the evening at the bottom of the scoreboard.

The Dutch conductor at the contest was Dolf van der Linden.

Voting

References

External links 
 Dutch Preselection 1968

1968
Countries in the Eurovision Song Contest 1968
Eurovision